Noh Do Young is a South Korean physicist specializing in condensed matter physics and materials science using synchrotrons and XFELs. He has developed and applied various frontier X-ray diffraction methods to study condensed matter systems, including recent coherent X-ray diffraction imaging technique. His research has utilized a number of synchrotron radiation facilities, such as Advanced Photon Source, SPring-8, National Synchrotron Light Source, PLS, and X-ray free electron lasers, including SCALA and PAL-XFEL. 

Most of his career has been at the Gwangju Institute of Science and Technology (GIST) where he was a physics professor, dean of GIST College, and director of the Center for Advanced X-ray Science and the GIST National Core Research Center. He has also served as member of the Korea Research Council of Fundamental Science Technology before becoming the president of the Korea Synchrotron Radiation User's Association. He is a council member of the Presidential Advisory Council for Science and Technology, and the third president of the Institute for Basic Science.

Education 
Noh received a B.S. in Physics from Seoul National University in 1985. He then went to the Massachusetts Institute of Technology for his Ph.D. which was completed in 1991 under doctoral adviser Professor Robert J. Birgeneau. His thesis was a series of X-ray scattering studies concerning the positional and orientational order in two and three dimensional liquid crystal systems.

Career 
After graduating, he stayed at the Massachusetts Institute of Technology as a post-doctoral associate through 1992. His next position was as a senior physicist at the Exxon Research and Engineering Company in 1993. Two years later, he returned to his home country and started working at the Gwangju Institute of Science and Technology as an assistant professor in the Department of Physics and Photon Science & School of Materials Science and Engineering. Over the years, he became a full professor, dean of GIST College, and director of the Graduate Program of Photonic Science & Technology and the Center for Advanced X-ray Science. He was also the director of the GIST National Core Research Center (NCRC)  from 2008-2015.

He has served as a member of the Korea Research Council of Fundamental Science Technology. Other positions include serving as the chairman of the Foundation Expert Committee, National Science & Technology Council, president of the Korea Synchrotron Radiation User's Association, and council member on the Presidential Advisory Council for Science and Technology. In November 2019, he became the third president of the Institute for Basic Science (IBS), a five-year position he will hold until November 2024. His inauguration ceremony was also the farewell ceremony for Kim Doochul, the second IBS president.

Honors and awards
2012: Science and Technology Medal, Korea
2010: Honorary doctorate degree, Nara Institute of Science and Technology
2007: Commendation, President of the Republic of Korea
2002: Commendation, Ministry of Science and Technology, Korea

See also
Oh Se-jung
Kim Doochul
Kuk Young

References

External links 
 X-ray Laboratory for Nanoscale Phenomena
 
 노도영 교육인 Naver 인문검색

Living people
1963 births
Seoul National University alumni
Massachusetts Institute of Technology alumni
South Korean physicists
Presidents of the Institute for Basic Science
Academic staff of Gwangju Institute of Science and Technology
South Korean scientists